Thomas Muster defeated Sergi Bruguera in the final, 7–6(8–6), 6–3, 6–1 to win the men's singles tennis title at the 1997 Miami Open.

Andre Agassi was the two-time defending champion, but lost in the second round to Scott Draper.

Seeds
All thirty-two seeds received a bye to the second round.

Draw

Finals

Top half

Section 1

Section 2

Section 3

Section 4

Bottom half

Section 5

Section 6

Section 7

Section 8

References
 Main draw

Men's Singles
Singles